The 1978 Hall of Fame Classic was a college football postseason bowl game that featured the Texas A&M Aggies and the Iowa State Cyclones.

Background
The Cyclones had finished 8-3 for the third straight year, going from being tied for 4th to 2nd to 3rd, respectively. This was their fourth bowl game of the decade. Emory Bellard had resigned as Aggie head coach after a 4-0 start led to two straight losses in Southwest Conference play. Tom Wilson led the Aggies to a 3-2 record down the stretch to get A&M to their fourth straight bowl season.

Game summary
Curtis Dickey ran for 278 yards on 34 carries while scoring a touchdown.

Second Quarter
Iowa State: Green 5 pass from Grant (kick failed)
Texas A&M: Brothers 1 run (Franklin kick)
Texas A&M: Carter 4 pass from Mosley (Franklin kick)

3rd QUARTER
Iowa State: Green 28 run (pass failed)

4th Quarter
Texas A&M: Dickey 19 run (Franklin kick)
Texas A&M: Armstrong 5 run (Franklin kick)

Aftermath
Bruce left for his alma mater Ohio State after the game, and the Cyclones would wait 22 years until their next bowl appearance. Texas A&M did not wait as long for their next bowl appearance, going to the Independence Bowl in 1981.

References

Hall of Fame Classic
All-American Bowl
Iowa State Cyclones football bowl games
Texas A&M Aggies football bowl games
December 1978 sports events in the United States